{{DISPLAYTITLE:C18H22N2S}}
The molecular formula C18H22N2S (molar mass: 298.44 g/mol, exact mass: 298.1504 u) may refer to:

 Alimemazine, or trimeprazine
 Vortioxetine